National Union may refer to:

Political organisations
National Union (Chad), a political party
National Union (Chile), an alliance during the Government Junta of Chile (1924)
National Union Movement, a pro-Pinochet political party from 1983 to 1987
National Union Party (Costa Rica), several liberal conservative parties
National Union (Gabon), a political party
National Union Party (Iran), a royalist party
National Union (Israel), an alliance of right-wing and nationalist parties from 1999 to 2013
National Union (Italy, 1923), a pro-fascist Catholic party
National Union (Italy, 1924), an anti-fascist party
National Union (Italy, 1947), a parliamentary group
National Union (Latvia), a far-right party from 1919 to 1934
National Union (Madagascar), an alliance of TIM, AVI and RPSD
National Union (Netherlands), a fascist party active during the 1920s and 1930s
National Union (Peru), a political party
National Union (Portugal), a party of the Estado Novo regime from 1930 to 1974
National Union (South Africa), a short-lived party founded in 1960
National Union (Spain, 1900), a regenerationist party from 1900 to 1902
National Union (Spain), a far right electoral coalition in 1979
National Union (Switzerland), a French-speaking fascist party between 1932 and 1939
National Union (Egypt), Nasser's party in the Egypt and the United Arab Republic, 1957–1962
National Union Party (United States), a temporary name for the Republican Party in 1864

Other uses
National Union (club), a political London gentlemen's club from 1887 to c.1900

See also
National Union of Greece, an anti-Semitic nationalist party from 1927 to 1944
National Unionist Party (Greece), a centre-left party from 1935 to 1950
Nationalist Union of the People, a political alliance from 1978
Kenya African National Union, a political party
Liberia National Union, a political party
Lithuanian Nationalist Union, a political party from 1924 to 1940
Russian National Union, a Neo-Nazi party from 1993 to c.1998
Transvaal National Union, an organisation supporting uitlanders from 1895 to 1896
Ukrainian National Union (political party), a far-right organisation
Union Nationale (Quebec), a provincial party in Canada from 1935 to 1989
Union of Nationalists, a political alliance from the 1940s
National Unity (disambiguation)
National Union for Democracy and Progress (disambiguation)